Belle of the West is the fifth studio album by American singer-songwriter Samantha Fish. It was released on November 3, 2017, under Ruf Records. The album was produced by Luther Dickinson at Zebra Ranch.

Critical reception 

Belle of the West was met with generally favorable reviews from critics. Marty Gunther writing for Blues Blast Magazine, described it as an "intimate jam session" that "delivers the feel of her native Midwest and the Old West". JD Nash writing for American Blues Scene described the album as "quite possibly, Fish's finest work to date."

Track listing

Personnel 
Adapted from the album's liner notes.

 Samantha Fish – vocals, guitar
 Amy LaVere – bass
 Trina Raimey – drums, vocals
 Tikyra Jackson – drums, vocals
 Sharde Thomas – fife, drums, vocals
 Lightnin' Malcolm – guitar, harmonica, vocals
 Jimbo Mathus – harmonica, vocals, piano
 Lillie Mae – violin, vocals

Charts

References 

2017 albums
Samantha Fish albums
Rounder Records albums